Paspalum ceresia is a species of grass in the family Poaceae. It is found in South America (Argentina, Bolivia, Brazil, Ecuador, Paraguay, Peru).

References

External links 
 
 
 Paspalum ceresia at the Plant List
 Paspalum ceresia at Tropicos

ceresia
Grasses of South America
Grasses of Argentina
Grasses of Brazil
Flora of Bolivia
Flora of Ecuador
Flora of Paraguay
Flora of Peru
Plants described in 1925